

Defunct airlines  
This is a list of now defunct airlines from Chad.

See also		

 Transport in Chad
 List of airports in Chad

References

Chad
Airlines
Airlines, defunct
Airlines